The 12th edition of the annual Holland Ladies Tour was held from September 1 to September 6, 2009. The women's stage race with an UCI rating of 2.2 started in Nuenen, and ended on the Cauberg in Valkenburg.

Stages

2009-09-01: Nuenen — Gerwen (123 km)

2009-09-02: Schijndel — Schijndel (13.3 km)

2009-09-03: Gieten — Gieten (108 km)

2009-09-04: Rijssen — Rijssen (124.8 km)

2009-09-05: Boxtel — Boxtel (121.5 km)

2009-09-06: Valkenburg — Valkenburg (Cauberg) (112.6 km)

Final standings

General Classification

Points classification

References 
 Wielerland
 CQ ranking

2009
Holland Ladies Tour
Holland Ladies Tour
Cycling in North Brabant
Cycling in Overijssel
Cycling in Aa en Hunze
Cycling in Nuenen, Gerwen en Nederwetten
Cycling in Valkenburg aan de Geul
Sport in Boxtel
Sport in Meierijstad
Sport in Rijssen-Holten